Richard Walter Wrangham (born 1948) is an English anthropologist and primatologist; he is Professor of Biological Anthropology at Harvard University. His research and writing have involved ape behavior, human evolution, violence, and cooking.

Biography 
Wrangham was born in Leeds, Yorkshire.

Following his years on the faculty of the University of Michigan, he became the Ruth Moore Professor of Biological Anthropology at Harvard University and his research group is now part of the newly established Department of Human Evolutionary Biology. He is a MacArthur fellow.

He is co-director of the Kibale Chimpanzee Project, the long-term study of the Kanyawara chimpanzees in Kibale National Park, Uganda. His research culminates in the study of human evolution in which he draws conclusions based on the behavioural ecology of apes. As a graduate student, Wrangham studied under Robert Hinde and Jane Goodall.

Wrangham is known predominantly for his work in the ecology of primate social systems, the evolutionary history of human aggression (in his 1996 book with Dale Peterson, Demonic Males: Apes and the Origins of Human Violence and his 2019 work The Goodness Paradox), and his research in cooking (summarized in his book, Catching Fire: How Cooking Made Us Human) and self-domestication. He is a vegetarian.

Wrangham has been instrumental in identifying behaviors considered "human-specific" in chimpanzees, including culture and with Eloy Rodriguez, chimpanzee self-medication.

Among the recent courses he teaches in the Human Evolutionary Biology (HEB) concentration at Harvard are HEB 1330 Primate Social Behaviour and HEB 1565 Theories of Sexual Coercion (co-taught with Professor Diane Rosenfeld from Harvard Law School). In March 2008, he was appointed House Master of Currier House at Harvard College. He received an honorary degree in Doctor of Science from Oglethorpe University in 2011.

Research
Wrangham began his career as a researcher at Jane Goodall's long-term common chimpanzee field study in Gombe Stream National Park in Tanzania. He befriended fellow primatologist Dian Fossey and assisted her in setting up her nonprofit mountain gorilla conservation organization, the Dian Fossey Gorilla Fund (originally the Digit Fund).

Wrangham's focused recently on the role cooking has played in human evolution. In Catching Fire: How Cooking Made Us Human, he argued that cooking food is obligatory for humans as a result of biological adaptations and that cooking, in particular the consumption of cooked tubers, might explain the increase in hominid brain sizes, smaller teeth and jaws, and decrease in sexual dimorphism that occurred roughly 1.8 million years ago. Some anthropologists disagree with Wrangham's ideas, arguing that  no solid evidence has been found  to support Wrangham's claims, though Wrangham and colleagues, among others, have demonstrated in the laboratory the effects of cooking on energetic availability: cooking denatures proteins, gelatinizes starches, and helps kill pathogens. The mainstream explanation is that human ancestors, prior to the advent of cooking, turned to eating meats, which then caused the evolutionary shift to smaller guts and larger brains.

In his 2019 book, The Goodness Paradox: The Strange Relationship Between Virtue and Violence in Human Evolution, Wrangham argues that humans have "domesticated" themselves by a process of self-selection, as opposed to our selective breeding of dogs, livestock, or (more recently) foxes by Dmitry Belyayev and others. Wrangham distinguishes between "reactive aggression", when individuals lash out or react to a provocation, and "proactive aggression", which is planned, premeditated, and involves deliberate risk-avoidant tactical strikes, including war and capital punishment. He claims that humans are paradoxically extraordinarily low in "reactive" aggression but very high in and highly skilled at "proactive" aggression, and he argues that the threat of proactive aggression by males has played a crucial role in human psychology, patriarchy, so-called "morality" and history.

Bibliography

Books
 Demonic Males with Peterson, D., Boston, MA: Houghton Mifflin. 1996. .
Smuts, B.B., Cheney, D.L. Seyfarth, R.M., Wrangham, R.W., & Struhsaker, T.T. (Eds.) (1987). Primate Societies. Chicago: University of Chicago Press. 
Catching Fire: How Cooking Made Us Human. Basic Books, 2009. 
The Goodness Paradox: The Strange Relationship Between Virtue and Violence in Human Evolution. Pantheon, 2019.

Papers

 Eds. Muller, M. & Wrangham, R. (2009). 'Sexual Coercion in Primates and Humans'. Harvard University Press, Cambridge, MA.

References

External links

 Website of Kibale Chimpanzee Project
 Department of Human Evolutionary Biology, Harvard University
 Video (with mp3 available) of interview about his research with Wrangham by John Horgan on Bloggingheads.tv

Living people
1948 births
Harvard University faculty
Human evolution theorists
Primatologists
MacArthur Fellows
University of Michigan faculty
Academics from Yorkshire
People from Leeds
Alumni of the University of Cambridge
Alumni of the University of Oxford
Corresponding Fellows of the British Academy